The red pike conger (Cynoponticus coniceps, also known as the conehead eel in Mexico) is an eel in the family Muraenesocidae (pike congers). It was described by David Starr Jordan and Charles Henry Gilbert in 1882, originally under the genus Muraenesox. It is a marine, tropical eel which is known from the eastern central and southeastern Pacific Ocean, including Mexico, Ecuador, Colombia, Costa Rica, Guatemala, El Salvador, Honduras, Panama, Peru, and Nicaragua.

The Red pike conger's diet consists of finfish and invertebrates. It is of commercial interest to fisheries, and is considered to have high quality flesh. It is also captured as a by-catch by shrimp trawlers.

The IUCN redlist currently lists the Red pike conger as Data Deficient, due to a lack of information on how the species is affected by fishing activities.

References

Muraenesocidae
Fish described in 1882
Taxa named by David Starr Jordan